The Yentl Syndrome is the different course of action that heart attacks usually follow for women than for men. This is a problem because much of medical research has focused primarily on symptoms of male heart attacks, and many women have died due to misdiagnosis because their symptoms present differently. The name is taken from the 1983 film Yentl starring Barbra Streisand in which her character plays the role of a male in order to receive the education she desires. The phrase was coined in a 1991 academic paper by Dr. Bernadine Healy titled "The Yentl syndrome."

Heart disease is the leading cause of death for women in the United States, killing 299,578 women in 2017—or about 1 in every 5 female deaths. However, heart disease continues to be thought of as a "man’s disease"

References

References

External links
 C. Noel Bairey Merz, MD
 

Causes of death
Symptoms and signs: Cardiac
Women's health
Syndromes
Medical terminology